South Peterboro Street Residential Historic District is a national historic district located at Canastota in Madison County, New York.  The district contains 44 contributing buildings.  It includes residences and churches built between about 1850 and 1930 and executed in a broad range of popular architectural styles.

It was added to the National Register of Historic Places in 1986.

References

Historic districts on the National Register of Historic Places in New York (state)
Colonial Revival architecture in New York (state)
Historic districts in Madison County, New York
National Register of Historic Places in Madison County, New York